Sergeant York is a 1941 American biographical film about the life of Alvin C. York, one of the most decorated American soldiers of World War I. Directed by Howard Hawks and starring Gary Cooper in the title role, the film was a critical and commercial success, and became the highest-grossing film of 1941.

The film was based on York's diary, as edited by Tom Skeyhill, and adapted by Harry Chandlee, Abem Finkel, John Huston, Howard E. Koch, and Sam Cowan (uncredited).  York refused, several times, to authorize a film version of his life story, but finally yielded to persistent efforts to finance the creation of an interdenominational Bible school.  The story that York insisted on Cooper for the title role comes from a telegram that producer Jesse L. Lasky wrote to Cooper pleading with him to accept the part, to which he signed York's name.

Cooper went on to win the Academy Award for Best Actor for his performance, while the film also won Best Film Editing and was nominated in nine other categories, including Best Picture, Director, Supporting Actor (Walter Brennan), and Supporting Actress (Margaret Wycherly). The American Film Institute ranked the film 57th in the its 100 most inspirational American movies. It also rated Alvin York 35th in its list of the top 50 heroes in American cinema.

In 2008, Sergeant York was selected for preservation in the United States National Film Registry by the Library of Congress as being "culturally, historically, or aesthetically significant".

Plot
Before America's entry into World War I, Alvin York is a poor, young farmer in rural Tennessee, living with his widowed mother, sister, and younger brother. Alvin's leisure time is spent fighting and getting drunk with friends. Alvin's goal is to purchase a piece of farmland, fertile "bottomland". Alvin works hard to acquire the price for the land, and is given an extension by the owner. Alvin's sharpshooting skills enable him to raise the money needed, but the owner reneges, making Alvin angry and bitter. En route to seek revenge, Alvin and his mule are struck by lightning. The incident prompts Alvin's conversion to Christianity.

When the U.S. enters World War I, Alvin seeks exemption as a conscientious objector, which is denied. Alvin is torn between fighting for his country and the biblical prohibition against killing. His sympathetic commanding officer gives him leave to go home and come to a decision. Alvin reconciles his moral conflict after reading the biblical injunction to "render unto Caesar the things that are Caesar's, and unto God the things that are God's."

During the Meuse–Argonne offensive, York's qualms vanish when he sees his friends and comrades being killed as they assault a strong German position. With his superiors dead or incapacitated, he takes charge. He infiltrates the German lines by himself and finds a position that lets him enfilade the main German defensive trench. He kills so many German soldiers that they eventually surrender to him en masse. One of the prisoners of war treacherously grenades Alvin's good friend, "Pusher" Ross, and is gunned down by York. He and the handful of survivors from his unit lead their many captives behind their lines, but have a hard time finding anyone to take the Germans off their hands. The officer who finally does is astonished to learn that so few men captured so many of the enemy.

York is decorated and hailed as a national hero, but desires to return home. He rejects commercial offers that would make him wealthy, explaining that he could not take money for doing his duty. York returns home to marry his fiancée, Gracie. To his surprise, the state has purchased the bottomland farm and built a house for Gracie and him.

Cast

Reception
Sergeant York was a success at the box office and became the highest-grossing film of 1941. This was influenced by the attack on Pearl Harbor, which occurred while the film was still playing in theaters. The film's patriotic theme helped recruit soldiers; young men sometimes went directly from the movie theater to military enlistment offices. After its initial release, the film was frequently reshown at theaters all over America during the war as a quick replacement for box-office flops and as a theme program for bond sales and scrap drives.

According to Warner Bros. records, the film earned $6,075,000 domestically and $2,184,000 internationally.

On review aggregator Rotten Tomatoes, the film holds an 88% rating based on 24 reviews, with an average rating of 7.4/10.

Accolades

References

Further reading
 Michael E. Birdwell, Celluloid Soldiers: The Warner Bros. Campaign against Nazism (NY: New York University Press, 1999)
 McCarthy, Todd, Howard Hawks: The Grey Fox of Hollywood (NY: Grove Press, 1997), ch. 22: "Sergeant York"
 Robert Brent Toplin, History by Hollywood: The Use and Abuse of the American Past (Chicago: University of Illinois Press, 1996)

External links

Sergeant York essay  by Donna Ross at National Film Registry

 
 
 
 
 
 Sergeant York And His People, by Sam Cowan, 1922, from Project Gutenberg
 Alvin York and the Meuse-Argonne Offensive, by Douglas Mastriano, Military History magazine, Sept 2006. (Corporal York's actions as seen from the German perspective.)
 Photos and details of the discovery of the site where York earned the Medal of Honor, Discovered 21 October 2006 by the Sergeant York Discovery Expedition.
 
 Sergeant York essay by Daniel Eagan in America's Film Legacy: The Authoritative Guide to the Landmark Movies in the National Film Registry, A&C Black, 2010 , pages 333–335 

1941 films
1940s war films
1940s biographical films
American war films
American biographical films
American black-and-white films
1940s English-language films
American World War I films
Western Front (World War I) films
World War I films based on actual events
Films set in Appalachia
Films set in Tennessee
Films about Christianity
Films featuring a Best Actor Academy Award-winning performance
Films whose editor won the Best Film Editing Academy Award
Warner Bros. films
Films produced by Hal B. Wallis
Films directed by Howard Hawks
Films with screenplays by John Huston
Films scored by Max Steiner
Films about the United States Army
United States National Film Registry films
Biographical films about military personnel
Films based on diaries
1940s American films